Lebedyansky is a Russian multi-national company that manufacturers fruit juice, baby food, vegetable juice, and soft drinks. The company is owned by PepsiCo, and is the largest fruit juice manufacturer in Eastern Europe and the sixth largest in the world. Lebedyansky has two major production centers, both located in the Lipetsk Oblast.

History
In 1967, a cannery was established in Lebedyan, Lipetsk Oblast, around 350 kilometers south of Moscow. The company produced canned fruits and vegetables.

In 1992 the company was privatized and transformed into a joint stock company. In 1996, Lebedyansky launched its first branded product, "Tonus Juice" and in 1998, the company management decided to pursue a major expansion.

On 20 March 2008, PepsiCo announced their acquisition of 75.53% of Lebedyansky, for the sum of US$ 1.4 billion, making PepsiCo the largest shareholder, and parent company of Lebedyansky. The purchase was completed on 28 August 2008.

Affiliated brands

In becoming the leading juice producer in Russia, Lebedyansky developed the following brands:

Premium
Ya
14 juices and nectars
4 traditional Russian berry flavors

Mid-priced
Tonus

Low-budget
Fruktoviy Sad, a brand that received heavy advertising campaigns, by itself accounts for 16% of all juice sold in Russia 
Apple Juice
Tomato Juice
10 different fruit nectars
Frustyle, a stylish brand that appeals to young people
Blood Orange
Kiwi
Mango-Papaya
Banana-Strawberry
Privet

Baby food
Lebedyanska
Frutonjanja (en: Fruitnurse)

See also
Wimm-Bill-Dann Foods, Russian yogurt and fruit juice producer, also owned by PepsiCo
PepsiCo, American multi-national corporation, parent company, and largest shareholder of Lebedyansky
Food industry of Russia

References

External links
 Official website (archived, 20 Jul 2011)

Drink companies of Russia
Drink companies of the Soviet Union
Manufacturing companies based in Moscow
Companies based in Lipetsk Oblast
Food and drink companies established in 1967
1967 establishments in Russia
PepsiCo subsidiaries
Companies formerly listed on the Moscow Exchange